Being Evel is a 2015 American documentary film about daredevil Evel Knievel, directed by Daniel Junge. The film documents his real life story until his death in 2007. It debuted at the 2015 Sundance Film Festival in January. It was produced by Jackass star Johnny Knoxville, who is one of the film's main interviewees.

Release

The film premiered at the 2015 Sundance Film Festival. It was also screened at the Sydney Film Festival in June 2015, and London Film Festival in October 2015.

Critical reception
The review aggregator website Rotten Tomatoes calculated a 97% approval rating based on 36 reviews. The site's critical consensus reads: "Insightful and swiftly paced, Being Evel is an entertaining, well-crafted overview of an unforgettable character."

References

External links

2015 documentary films
2015 films
Dickhouse Productions films
2010s English-language films
American documentary films
English-language documentary films